The Cambridge University Railway Club (CURC) was formed in 1911 and is the third oldest railway club in the world, after The Railway Club (1899 - now defunct) and the Stephenson Locomotive Society (1909).  It is one of the clubs and societies of the University of Cambridge. The club is engaged closely with the railway industry.

The CURC activities include:
 Career fairs, promoting career opportunities in the railway industry.
 Meetings, where a line of notable speakers have spoken, including Sir Nigel Gresley, Keith Williams and Sir Peter Hendy.
 Visits, including Steam drives and Brake Van rides.
 Annual Photo Competition
 Annual dinner at a Cambridge University college or on train

The CURC had a good friendship with the Oxford University Railway Society (OURS), with an annual Varsity Quiz. However OURS folded in the late 1990s.

Locomotive and Logo

The CURC has a logo of "Eagle", which is the only locomotive designed and built in Cambridge.
Eagle

CURC adopted a Class 08 locomotive 08631 at Coldham Lane Depot in Cambridge until the depot was mothballed for a time in 1996. In 2022, a Class 66 locomotive 66786 was named after the club at Cambridge Railway Station to commemorate its 110 anniversary.

References

External links
Cambridge University Railway Club
Science and Society Picture Library - CURC group photo, 1934

Railway
Railway societies
Rail transport in Cambridge